Skyway is a 1933 American Pre-Code romantic comedy film directed by Lewis D. Collins.

Plot
Pilot "Flash" Norris is always getting into trouble with his fists, and his quick temper. His girl, Lila, tries to get him to simmer down; and, convinces her father to give him a job in his bank. When the bank won’t invest in his old friend, George Taylor’s airline, Flash quits the bank.

But, when money goes missing, from the bank, it’s up to Flash to prove his innocence, recover the money, and catch up with the bank’s Vice President Baker and his girlfriend Mazie, before their ship takes them to a jurisdiction, without an extradition treaty. Lila doesn’t give up hope, waiting for Flash, and her ship to come in.

Cast
Ray Walker as Robert "Flash" Norris
Kathryn Crawford as Lila Beaumont
Arthur Vinton as John Hamilton
Claude Gillingwater as John Beaumont
Lucien Littlefield as Webster
Tom Dugan as Tug
Jed Prouty as Calvin Baker
Alice Lake as Mazie
George "Gabby" Hayes as George Taylor
Edmund Cobb as Pilot Fredericks

External links

1933 films
1933 romantic comedy films
1930s English-language films
American black-and-white films
Monogram Pictures films
American aviation films
American romantic comedy films
1930s American films